This is a list of universities and colleges in Kuwait.

 Algonquin College - Kuwait (AC)
 American International University - Kuwait (AIU)
 American University of Kuwait (AUK)
 American University of the Middle East (AUM)
 American College of the Middle East (ACM)
 Arab Open University (AOU)
 Australian College of Kuwait (ACK)
 Box Hill College - Kuwait (BHCK)
 Gulf University for Science and Technology (GUST)
 Kuwait College of Science and Technology (KCST)
 Kuwait Maastricht Business School
 Kuwait University (KU)
 College of Aviation Technology (CAT)
 The Public Authority for Applied Education and Training (PAAET)

References

External links 
 https://universityimages.com/list-of-universities-in-kuwait/

 
Universities
Kuwait
Kuwait